Best in the World (2019), was a two night, two city professional wrestling event produced by Ring of Honor (ROH), that took place on June 28, 2019 at UMBC Event Center in Baltimore, Maryland (PPV) and on June 29, 2019 at the 2300 Arena in Philadelphia, Pennsylvania (tapings for ROH's flagship program Ring of Honor Wrestling).

Storylines
Best in the World featured professional wrestling matches that involved wrestlers from pre-existing scripted feuds, plots, and storylines that played out on ROH's primary television program, Ring of Honor Wrestling. Wrestlers portrayed heroes or villains as they followed a series of events that built tension and culminated in a wrestling match or series of matches.

Matches

Night 1 – Baltimore, MD

Pre-show 
During the pre-show,
Rush defeated Flip Gordon after performing the "Bull's Horns".

Eli Drake, who recently signed with NWA, made his ROH debut. He announced he's going to be Nick Aldis tag team partner, replacing the injured Colt Cabana.

Preliminary matches 
The actual pay-per-view opened with Dalton Castle facing Dragon Lee. Castle won after performing Lee's finisher the "Bull's horns".

Next, The Allure (Angelina Love and Mandy Leon) (who was accompanied by Velvet Sky) faced Jenny Rose and Kelly Klein. During the match, Leon knocked Klein with a high heel show as the referee was distracted, allowing Love to hit the "Botox Injection" for the win. After the match, Maria Manic made her debut, where she appeared behind The Allure. As The Allure escaped the ring, Manic attacked the security guards.

After that, Jay Lethal faced Kenny King in a best out of three series, in which both wrestlers already scored one victory over each other. King won with the "Royal Flush", winning the best out of three series.

In the fourth match, Jonathan Gresham faced Silas Young in a Pure Rules match. Gresham submitted Young with the Octopus hold to win the match.

Next, The Briscoe Brothers (Jay Briscoe and Mark Briscoe) faced Eli Drake and Nick Aldis. The match ended in a double countout. after the match, Mark put Aldis through a table with the "Froggy Bow".

After that, Shane Taylor defended the ROH World Television Championship against Bandido. Taylor performed the "Greetings from 216" to retain the title.

In the penultimate match, the Villain Enterprises (Brody King, Marty Scurll and PCO) defended the ROH World Six-Man Tag Team Championship against Lifeblood (Mark Haskins, P. J. Black and Tracy Williams). PCO performed a diving "PCO-sault" on Black to retain the title for his team. After the match, the Soldiers of Savagery attacked Lifeblood. Bandido made the save, which until Bully Ray attacked him Gordon appeared in the ring, as Ray ran away. Scrull appeared on the screen to introduce the new member of the Villain Enterprises, Gordon. The Villain Enterprises attacked Lifeblood, which ended by Gordon performing a 450° splash, turning heel in the process.

Main event 
In the main event, Matt Taven defended the ROH World Championship against Jeff Cobb. Taven performed the "Climax" to retain the title.

Results

Night 1 (PPV)

Night 2 – Philadelphia, PA (TV Tapings)

See also
2019 in professional wrestling

References

Professional wrestling in Baltimore
2019 in Maryland
June 2019 events in the United States
Events in Baltimore
2019 in professional wrestling
Ring of Honor pay-per-view events